The Cathedral of St. John the Baptist is the mother church of the Roman Catholic Diocese of Charleston, located in Charleston, South Carolina. Designed by Brooklyn architect Patrick Keely in the Gothic Revival style, it opened in 1907. The Most Reverend Jacques E. Fabre, the fourteenth Bishop of Charleston, was ordained and installed on May 13, 2022

History

The first brownstone cathedral was built in 1854 and named the Cathedral of Saint John and Saint Finbar. It burned in a great fire in December 1861. The rebuilt cathedral was named for St. John the Baptist and was constructed on the foundations of the earlier structure. Architect Patrick Keely designed both the original cathedral and its replacement.

The cornerstone was laid in 1890 by James Cardinal Gibbons of Baltimore, and the church opened in 1907. The cathedral seats 720 people and is noted for its Franz Mayer & Co. stained glass, hand–painted Stations of the Cross, and neo-gothic architecture. The lower church includes a crypt where Bishop England (with his sister, Joanna) and four other Charleston bishops are buried. The spire was not built at the time due to the lack of funds during the construction of the cathedral and its numerous renovations. The church was finally completed on March 25, 2010, with the addition of the steeple and bells. The front iron fence to the east, is all that remains of the 1815 St. Andrews Society Hall, which also burned in 1861.

Architecture
P.C. Keely designed the cathedral in the Gothic Revival style; it is constructed of Connecticut brownstone. The pews are of carved Flemish oak. The plans for the reconstruction were along the lines of the original, but D.C. Barbot made some changes too.

Chapels
Sacred Heart – The chapel is situated just to the left of the cathedra. It originally served as the Chapel of the Blessed Sacrament, reflecting the fact that in certain Masses prior to 1968, when the bishop sat in front of the altar, the Blessed Sacrament was removed to this altar so that he would not have his back to the reserved Sacrament. It contains seven windows depicting symbols related to the Eucharist. In 2008, it briefly became the Chapel of Saint Paul for the Year of Saint Paul. Then in 2009, it became the Sacred Heart Chapel, housing an early 1900s statue of the Sacred Heart of Jesus with hands extended in blessing.
Blessed Virgin Mary – The altar in this chapel is adorned with an Italian Marble statue of the Madonna and Child, sculpted by the German artist Ferdinand Pettrich. The statue is considered unique as it depicts Mary without a head covering, holding the child Jesus as a toddler. It is sometimes referred to as Our Lady of the South or Our Lady of the Confederacy (though not officially) having been purchased by Bishop Lynch, the Confederate Ambassador to the Holy See and third Bishop of Charleston. The chapel is adorned with seven windows depicting symbols related to Mary, Mother of God, and one floral design window completely obscured by the altar.
Our Lady of Grace – The main lower chapel used for daily Masses. The chapel is adorned on one side with eight stained-glass windows removed from the former Immaculate Conception Church in Charleston. It originally had 20 windows from the church, but 12 were removed for various reasons over the years.
Saint John the Baptist Crypt Chapel – The resting place of the first five bishops of Charleston and Joanna Monica England, sister of the first Bishop of Charleston, John England. The bishops vest here for Holy Mass. The chapel contains one altar with a custom hand painted altarpiece depicting St. John the Baptist over the South Carolina landscape holding a lamb with two adoring angels, one holding a crosier and the other the diocesan coat of arms. In this chapel is a niche holding a statue of St. Joseph and the child Jesus. The crypt chapel is adorned with windows made from pieces of windows recovered from that were removed from Immaculate Conception Church.

Windows

The cathedral is noted for its Franz Mayer & Co. stained-glass windows. It has a couple of one-of-a-kind windows.
The three sets of doors are all surmounted by rose windows that are of a unique design (the design is only known to be used by Patrick Keely). Each window has a coat of arms in its center.
The Main Doors – Bishop Northop's coat of arms
The East Doors – the State of South Carolina's coat of arms
The West Doors – Pope Pius X's coat of arms
The large Life of Christ windows adorn the sides of the lower nave.
The windows in the upper nave are known as the Gallery of the Saints. They depict 28 saints.
The clerestory in the Sanctuary is adorned with windows depicting the four evangelists. Above the High Altar is the Chancel window. The top section is a rose window depicting St. John the Baptist baptizing Jesus with the Holy Spirit above. It is surrounded by wight adoring angels playing instruments. Above the Rose window is a Sacred Heart. To the left of the Rose window is a pelican feeding her three newborn pelicans, and to the right is the Lamb of God. Below all of this is a five-light replica of Da Vinci's Last Supper.

Organ

 The Upper Church Organ is a Bedient Pipe Organ, Opus 22, mechanical action instrument with two manuals, 26 stops and 32 ranks. It was originally installed in Christ Church Episcopal Cathedral, Louisville, Kentucky in 1986. Maker Gene Bedient reinstalled the instrument in the cathedral in 1995. This replaced Opus 139 by the Ernest M. Skinner Co. installed in 1903.

Renovations
In 2007, Bishop Robert J. Baker and Cathedral Rector Rev. Msgr. Joseph Roth announced plans to renovate and complete the cathedral nearly one-hundred years after it opened. The stained-glass windows were refurbished in December 2007. The brownstone has been refurbished, the mortar has been replaced and, after 103 years of waiting, a spire with three bells now tops the cathedral. A $6.2 million contract for restoration and the steeple addition was completed on March 25, 2010.

In 2019, interior renovations began by Conrad Schmitt Studios.

Cathedral clergy

Bishops
The Most Reverend Jacques Fabre-Jeune, CS, Bishop of Charleston

Rectors of the cathedral

Reverend Monsignor Budds
Reverend Father James J May 
Reverend Monsignor Joseph Bernarden 
Reverend Frederick J Hopwood
Reverend Monsignor Thomas R Duffy (Administrator c. 1984-1987)
Reverend Monsignor Charles Rowland, P.A. (?-?; 1987 - 1990)
Reverend Monsignor Sam R. Miglarese (1990 - 1998)
Reverend Monsignor Chester M. Moczydlowski (1998–2001)
Reverend Monsignor Joseph R. Roth, P.A. (2001–2008)
Reverend Gregory B. Wilson (2008–2011)
Reverend Monsignor Steven L. Brovey (2011–2022)
Reverend Monsignor D. Anthony Droze (Administrator pro tempore, 2022) 
Very Reverend Gregory B Wilson (2022- )

Associated Clergy

Reverend Father Bonaventure Di Camilo, OFM

Reverend Father George Landry 

Reverend Father James Parker

Reverend Father Mark Smith

Reverend Father Gary D. Dilley

Reverend Mr Samuel E. Hanvey (1976 - ?)

Reverend Father Gregory H West

Reverend Father Duane T Riplog

Reverend Father Ernest Kennedy

Reverend Father Eugene L. Condon

Reverend Father John Laurence Manning

Spire and bell tower
The cathedral with its new spire is the seventh tallest building in the city. The spire is covered in copper lattice and is topped with a 16x9 foot gilded copper Celtic cross. The arches below were fabricated from a special fiberglass used in ship building, which was then clad in copper. The arches are decorated by brown cast stone pinnacles on each corner. The belfry section is also constructed of brown cast stone. It has copper louvers. The new spire was designed by Glenn Keyes Architects using a sketch of the steeple from the original 1851 building.

Bells

The bells were placed in the cathedral tower on November 16, 2009. Together the three bronze bells form an E major chord. These bells were cast by Christoph Paccard Bell Foundries in France and blessed by Bishop Robert E. Guglielmone on October 15, 2009.

Saint Therese
Note:B-3
Inscription: Revelation 5:12
Saint Finbar
Note:G#-3
Inscription: Psalm 104:33
Maria Stella Maris (Latin:Mary, Star of the Sea)
Note:E-3
Inscription: Psalm 95:1

Music

Director of Music

Director of Music and Organist (1950–1991): Virginia (Mrs. H. Tracy) Sturcken
Director of Music (1991–2000): Bill Schlitt
Director of Music and Principal Organist (2000–2009): Mark Thomas
Organist and Choirmaster (May 2010 – 2014): Scott Turkington
Organist and Choirmaster (2014 – January 2019): Daniel Sansone
Director of Sacred Music (2019 to present): Scott Powell

Choirs
The Cathedral Choir – principal choir

See also
List of Catholic cathedrals in the United States
List of cathedrals in the United States

References

External links

 Official Cathedral Site
 Roman Catholic Diocese of Charleston Official Site
 The Cathedral of Saint John the Baptist Choirs

Religious organizations established in 1800
Roman Catholic churches completed in 1907
John the Baptist (Charleston), Cathedral of Saint
Churches in Charleston, South Carolina
Patrick Keely buildings
Roman Catholic churches in South Carolina
Gothic Revival church buildings in South Carolina
1800 establishments in South Carolina
Roman Catholic Diocese of Charleston
20th-century Roman Catholic church buildings in the United States